The list of Igbo people includes notable individuals who have full or significant ancestry traced back to the Igbo people of South-East and South-South geopolitical regions of Nigeria.

This page also contains names of people who traced their African heritage through DNA testing to the Igbo ethnic group.

Beauty pageant winners and models

Miss Nigeria & Most Beautiful Girl in Nigeria
 Debbie Collins, Miss World 2016 Nigeria representative
 Unoaku Anyadike, Most Beautiful Girl in Nigeria 2015, Miss World 2015 Nigeria representative
 Iheoma Nnadi, Most Beautiful Girl in Nigeria 2014, Miss World 2014 Nigeria representative
 Ezinne Akudo, Miss Nigeria 2013
 Sylvia Nduka, Most Beautiful Girl in Nigeria 2011, Miss World 2011 Nigeria representative
 Fiona Amuzie-Iredu, Most Beautiful Girl in Nigeria 2010, Miss World 2010 Nigeria representative
 Glory Umunna, Most Beautiful Girl in Nigeria 2009, Miss World 2009 Nigeria representative
 Adaeze Igwe, Most Beautiful Girl in Nigeria 2008, Miss World 2008 Nigeria representative, wife of former Nigerian football team captain Joseph Yobo
 Munachi Nwankwo, Most Beautiful Girl in Nigeria 2007, Miss World 2007 Nigeria representative
 Chinenye Ochuba, Most Beautiful Girl in Nigeria 2002, Miss World 2002 Top 10 finalist, African Continental Queen of Beauty
 Sabina Umeh, Most Beautiful Girl in Nigeria 1990
 Bianca Odumegwu-Ojukwu, Most Beautiful Girl in Nigeria 1988, Miss Africa 1988, Miss Intercontinental 1989, Nigeria ambassador to Spain 2012–15, wife of the late Biafran President Odumegwu Ojukwu
 Lynda Chuba-Ikpeazu, Miss Africa 1987, 2nd Nigerian to represent Nigeria in Miss Universe 1987 after a 23-year absence of the country in the paegent

Mister Nigeria
 Ikenna Bryan Okwara, Mr Nigeria 2007, semi-finalist Mister World 2007

Runway models and magazine covers
 Ngo Okafor, arguably the internet's most downloaded black male model.
 Oluchi Onweagba, winner of Face of Africa 1998; she has starred in shows for Gucci, Carolina Herrera, John Galliano, Missoni, Tommy Hilfiger, Chanel, Bottega Veneta, Christian Dior, Alessandro Dell'Acqua, Jeremy Scott, Helmut Lang, Fendi, Mary Timms, Anna Sui, Givenchy, Kenzo, Giorgio Armani, Céline, Nina Ricci, and Diane Von Furstenberg

More pageant winners
 Collete Nwadike, winner of the Exquisite Face of the Universe Pageant, winner of Miss Tourism Nigeria 2014, and special advisor to the Governor of Anambra State on tourism

Music producers 
 DJ Coublon, awarded Producer of the Year by All Africa Music Awards (AFRIMA)
 Masterkraft, won Music Producer of the Year at both the City People Entertainment Awards and Nigeria Entertainment Awards.

Actors and actresses

Foreign
 Annie Ilonzeh, starred in General Hospital, Charlie's Angels, Arrow, Drop Dead Diva, Empire, All Eyez on Me, 'Til Death Do Us Part, Percy Jackson & the Olympians: The Lightning Thief
 Antonia Okonma, starred as Darlene Cake in the ITV series Bad Girls
 Ashley Madekwe, film credits include Bambi in the ITV2 series Secret Diary of a Call Girl, Ashley Davenport on the ABC drama series Revenge and the witch Tituba in the WGN America series Salem
 Carmen Ejogo, hosted the Saturday Disney morning show. Film credits include Love's Labour's Lost (2000), What's the Worst That Could Happen? (2001), Away We Go (2009), Sparkle (2012), Alex Cross (2012), The Purge: Anarchy (2014), It Comes at Night (2017), Alien: Covenant (2017). She Picquery in the Fantastic Beasts film series, Coretta Scott King in two films: Boycott (2001) and Selma (2014)
 Caroline Chikezie, Her movie roles include Sasha Williams in As If, Elaine Hardy in Footballers' Wives, Queen Tamlin in The Shannara Chronicles, the Cyberwoman in Torchwood, Nasuada in Eragon
 Charles Venn,  known for his roles as Ray Dixon in EastEnders, Jacob Masters in Casualty, Curtis Alexander in Dream Team, Tremaine Gidigbi in Footballers' Wives
 Chike Nwoffiah, actor, theater director and filmmaker. Listed as one of the "Top Ten Most Influential African Americans" in the San Francisco Bay Area, he has served on several regional and national grant review panels including: the National Endowment for the Arts, Pennsylvania Council on the Arts, Sacramento Arts Commission, San Francisco Arts Commission, Arts Council Silicon Valley, Walter and Elise Haas Fund and the Center for Cultural Innovation
 Chiké Okonkwo, starred as PC Clark in New Tricks and DC Callum Gada in Paradox. He currently stars as Lee Truitt, the love interest of the title character on the BET series Being Mary Jane
 Chiwetel Ejiofor, Award-winning and two-time Golden Globe Award-nominated actor, Brother of CNN newscaster Zain Asher
 Cyril Nri, actor, writer and director who starred as Superintendent "Adam Okaro" in the police TV series The Bill
 Enuka Okuma, starred in Rookie Blue, Madison, Sue Thomas: F.B.Eye, Hillside
 Ifeanyi Chijindu 
 Megalyn Echikunwoke, starred as Tara Price in CSI: Miami, Isabelle Tyler in The 4400 and as Mari McCabe / Vixen in the Arrowverse. Partner of comedian and actor Chris Rock
 Nonso Anozie, starred as Tank in RocknRolla, Sergeant Dap in Ender's Game, Abraham Kenyatta in Zoo, Captain of the Guards in Cinderella and Xaro Xhoan Daxos in the HBO television series Game of Thrones
 Phina Oruche, actress, radio presenter and former model who starred as Liberty Baker in ITV's Footballers' Wives, for which she won a Screen Nations Award for Favourite TV Star
 Tracy Ifeachor, known for roles in Blooded, Billionaire Ransom, Casualty, Doctor Who, Strike Back, Jo, Crossbones, Hawaii Five-0, Ina Paha, The Originals, Quantico
 Uzo Aduba, starred as Suzanne "Crazy Eyes" Warren on the Netflix original series Orange Is the New Black, winner of an Emmy Award for Outstanding Guest Actress in a Comedy Series in 2014, an Emmy Award for Outstanding Supporting Actress in a Drama Series in 2015, and two Screen Actors Guild Awards for Outstanding Performance by a Female Actor in a Comedy Series in 2014 and 2015. She is one of only two actors to win an Emmy Award in both the comedy and drama categories for the same role.

Traced heritage
 Blair Underwood, American television and film actor nominated for a 2009 Golden Globe Award for his role on In Treatment
 Danny Glover
 Forest Whitaker, American actor, producer, and director who won an Academy Award for his performance as Ugandan dictator Idi Amin in the 2006 film The Last King of Scotland'
 Paul Robeson (1898–1976), multi-lingual American actor, athlete, Basso cantante concert singer, writer, civil rights activist, fellow traveler, Spingarn Medal winner, and Stalin Peace Prize laureate

Nollywood
 Afro Candy
 Amaechi Muonagor, actor and producer. Igodo, Without Goodbye, Most Wanted Kidnappers, Jack and Jill, Village Rascal, Evil World, Ugonma, Spirits
 Bob-Manuel Udokwu, Lifetime Achievement award winner at the 10th Africa Movie Academy Awards 
 Chacha Eke, starred in The End is Near, Commander in Chief, Clap of Thunder, Two Hearts
 Chelsea Eze
 Chidi Mokeme, actor and ex host of the Gulder Ultimate Search Reality-show
 Chika Ike, winner of the Actors Guild of Nigeria (AGN) Award for Most Disciplined Actress
 Chinedu "Aki" Ikedieze, He is best known for his character "Aki", playing alongside Osita Iheme in their breakthrough movie Aki na Ukwa, recipient of the Lifetime Achievement Award at the African Movie Academy Awards.
 Chioma Chukwuka, actress and movie producer, winner of the Africa Movie Academy Award for Best Actress in a leading role, winner of the Afro Hollywood award for Best actress in a lead role
 Cynthia Shalom, actress and producer, winner of Next Movie Star reality show season 11
 Chioma Okoye
 Chioma Toplis
 Chizzy Alichi, winner City People Entertainment Awards Best New Actress Of The Year (English), winner Nigeria Achievers Award Next Rated Actress Of The Year
 Clem Ohameze, starred in Ije: The Journey
 Destiny Etiko
 Ebele Okaro, Best Supporting Actress 2017 Africa Magic Viewers Choice Awards
 Ebube Nwagbo, starred in Arrested by Love, Eyes of the Nun, Before My Eyes, Against My Blood, Royal Palace, Not Yours!, Ojuju calabar
 Ejike Asiegbu, former President of the Actors Guild of Nigeria.
 Emeka Ike
 Enyinna Nwigwe, best known for The Wedding Party, Black November, Black Gold
 Francis Agu (1965–2007), actor. Best known for his role on the long-running Nigerian television series Checkmate
Frederick Leonard 
 Genevieve Nnaji, winner African Movie Academy Award for Best Actress in a Leading Role, Africa Magic Viewers Choice Awards for Best Movie West Africa, Nigeria Entertainment Awards for Best Actress Tv Series and Best Actress in Supporting Role, Nollywood Movies Awards for Viewers Choice- Female, Ghana Movie Awards for Best Actress-Africa Collaboration, NAFCA for Best Actress Leading Role, Best of Nollywood Awards for Best Kiss, Zulu African Film Academy Awards for Best Actress, City People Entertainment Awards for Best Actress. Member of the Order of the Federal Republic 
 Hanks Anuku, often stars as a villain in many Nollywood films. Brother of Miss Nigeria 1986 Late Rita Anuku
 Ijeoma Grace Agu
 Jim Iyke, one of the stars of the movie Last Flight to Abuja
 John Okafor, acted in more than 200 movies including Mr.Ibu (2004), Mr.Ibu in London (2004), Police Recruit (2003), 9 Wives (2005), Ibu in Prison (2006) and Keziah (2007).
 Kanayo O. Kanayo
 Ken Erics
 Linda Ejiofor
 Lota Chukwu
 Mercy Johnson
 Michael Ezuruonye 
 Mike Godson
 Monalisa Chinda
 Muna Obiekwe
 Ngozi Ezeonu
 Nuella Njubigbo
 Nkem Owoh
 Nonso Diobi
 Oby Kechere
 OC Ukeje
 Oge Okoye 
 Onyeka Onwenu 
 Osita "Paw paw" Iheme 
 Patience Ozokwor
 Pete Edochie
 Prince Eke
 Queen Nwokoye
 Rachael Okonkwo
 Regina Daniels
 Rita Dominic 
 Saint Obi
 Stella Damasus-Aboderin
 Stephanie Okereke, Best Actress – English and Best Actress of the year 2003, Reel Awards 2003 – also nominated twice for the African Movie Academy Award 2005 and 2009 for Best Actress in a Leading Role
 Sylvia Oluchy
 Tonto Dike
 Tony Umez
 Uche Jombo
 Uru Eke
 Yul Edochie
 Zack Orji

Comedians 
 Basketmouth
 Buchi
 Chigul
 Frank D Don
 Godfrey

TV/Radio hosts and journalists
 Adaora Onyechere, co-anchor of morning show Kakaaki on AIT
 Ebuka Obi-Uchendu, Big Brother Naija and Rubbing minds host
 Emma Ugolee
 Joyce Ohajah
 Keme Nzerem, Channel 4 News news anchor and reporter.
 Murphy Ijemba
 Ogechukwukanma Ogwo
 Tobechi Nneji, "Most listened-to OAP in all of Eastern Nigeria at mid-day" according to ThisDay newspaper
 Uti Nwachukwu
 Zain Asher, news anchor at CNN, sister of actor Chiwetel Ejiofor

Artists and illustrators
 Ada Udechukwu
 Ben Enwonwu (1921–1994)
 Chike Aniakor 
 Chris Ofili
 Dawn Okoro 
 Demas Nwoko
 Chidi Kwubiri
 George Edozie
 Ifeanyi Chijindu
 Ken Nwadiogbu
 Mendi & Keith Obadike
 Ndidi Dike
 Nnenna Okore 
 Obiora Udechukwu 
 Tony Nsofor
 Uche Okeke
 Kelvin Okafor

Authors
 Ada Udechukwu (born 1960)
 Adaobi Tricia Nwaubani
 Akwaeke Emezi (born 1987)
 Africanus Horton(1835–1883), also known as James Beale, he was a writer and folklorist from Sierra Leone
 Buchi Emecheta (1944–2017) 
 Catherine Obianuju Acholonu (1951–2014) 
 Chika Unigwe (born 1974)
 Chimamanda Ngozi Adichie (born 1977), best known for Half of a Yellow Sun
 Chinua Achebe (1930–2013), novelist, poet and critic, best known for his award-winning novel Things Fall Apart
 Chinweizu Ibekwe (born 1943)
 Chris Abani (born 1966), notable for his first novel, Masters of the Board, which was about a Neo-Nazi takeover of Nigeria
 Christopher Okigbo (1932–1967)
 Cyprian Ekwensi (1921–2007)
 Chuma Mmeka, also known as T-char, he is a poet, actor, writer, award-winning humanitarian well known for his poetry chapbook The Broken Home
 E. Nolue Emenanjo (born 1943)
 Edward Wilmot Blyden (1832–1912), Liberian educator, clergyman and Pan-Africanist 
 Elizabeth Isichei (born 1939), prominent historian
 Emma Ugolee (born 1975)
 F. Nnabuenyi Ugonna (1936–1990)
 Flora Nwapa (1931–1993)
 Ifeanyi Chijindu (born 1978)
 Ifeoma Onyefulu (born 1959)
 Ike Oguine
 Jeff Unaegbu (born 1979)
 Joy Chinwe Eyisi (born 1969), best known for her Common Errors in the Use of English
 Michael Echeruo (born 1937)
 Okey Ndibe (born 1960)
 Okwui Enwezor (1963–2019)
 Olaudah Equiano (c. 1745–1797), also known as Gustavus Vassa, was a writer and abolitionist
 Onuora Nzekwu (1928–2017)
 Onyeka Nwelue (born 1988)
 Nkem Nwankwo (1936–2001)
 Nnedi Okorafor (born 1974)
 Nnorom Azuonye (born 1967)
 Paschal Eze 
 Uche Nduka (born 1963)
 Uchechi Kalu
 Uzodinma Iweala (born 1982)
 Vincent Chukwuemeka Ike (1931–2020)
 William Napoleon Barleycorn (1884–1925), Spanish Guinean Primitive Methodist missionary and author of the first Bube language primer. He was a member of a prominent Fernandino family.
 Zulu Sofola (1935–1995), the first published female Nigerian playwright and dramatist and first female Professor of Theater Arts in Africa

Film makers, producers and directors 
 Amaka Igwe
 Chet Anekwe
 Chika Anadu
 Chinedum Iregbu
 Chineze Anyaene
 C. J. Obasi
 Chris Ihidero
 David Nnaji
 Dickson Iroegbu
 Eddie Ugbomah
 Ikechukwu Onyeka
 Izu Ojukwu
 Lonzo Nzekwe
 Mildred Okwo
 Nkiru Njoku
 Obi Emelonye
 Oby Kechere
 Okechukwu Oku
 Onyeka Nwelue
 Pascal Amanfo
 Pascal Atuma
 Sam Ukala
 Uche Odoh
 Mary Uranta
 Uzo

Singers and musicians

Gospel singers 
 Ada Ehi
 Frank Edwards
 Mercy Chinwo
 Obiwon
 Samsong
 Sinach

Pre-2000s 
 Bright Chimezie 
 Celestine Ukwu
 Chief Stephen Osita Osadebe 
 Dr Alban
 Jide Obi
 Joshua Uzoigwe
 Mendi & Keith Obadike
 Mike Ejeagha
 Nelly Uchendu
 Oliver De Coque
 Onyeka Onwenu
 Oriental brothers
 Patti Boulaye
 Pericoma Okoye
 William Onyeabor

2000s 
 Amarachi
 Bracket
 Chidinma
 Chike
 Chikezie
 CKay
 Duncan Mighty
 Dekumzy
 Echezonachukwu Nduka
 Ego Ihenacho
 Emeka Nwokedi
 Emma Nyra
 Emmy Gee
 Etcetera Ejikeme
 Faze
 Flavour N'abania
 Humblesmith
 J. Martins
 Jidenna 
 Kcee
 Kele Okereke, vocalist and rhythm guitarist for English indie rock band Bloc Party
 Lachi
 Lemar
 Leo the Lion 
 Lynxxx
 Mr Raw
 Muma Gee
 Naeto C
 Nneka
 P-Square, R&B duo composed of identical twin brothers Peter and Paul Okoye
 Patoranking
 Phyno 
 Ric Hassani
 Ruggedman
 Runtown
 SHiiKANE
 Tekno
 Tinie Tempah
 Ty
 Ugoccie
 Tyler, the Creator
 Waconzy
 2Shotz
Tobe Nwigwe
Victony
Yemi Alade

Education

Historians

Philosophers

Heads of organizations and business executives

Economists
 Arunma Oteh, Vice President and Treasurer at World Bank
 Charles Chukwuma Soludo, economics professor and former Governor and Chairman of the board of directors of the Central Bank of Nigeria (CBN)
 Godwin Emefiele, Governor of the Central Bank of Nigeria
 Ngozi Okonjo-Iweala, former Finance Minister and Foreign Minister of Nigeria, notable for being the first woman to hold either of those positions. She is also a former World Bank managing director and a one-time Presidential candidate of the same institution, member Twitter board
 Obiageli Ezekwesili, former Vice President of the World Bank and Education Minister as well as a co-founder of Transparency International
 Onyema Ugochukwu, economist, journalist, and politician
 Pat Utomi
 Pius Okigbo
 Priscilla Ekwere Eleje, first Nigerian female to have her signature appended on the naira and current Director of currency operations, Central Bank of Nigeria

Bloggers
 Kenneth Uwadi
 Linda Ikeji
 Noble Igwe
 Uche Eze

Journalists

Judges
 Chile Eboe-Osuji, Judge of the International Criminal Court
 Pats Acholonu (1936 - 2006), Supreme Court of Nigeria justice
 Chukwudifu Oputa (1924 - 2014), supreme Court of Nigeria justice

Political figures

Activists

Military rulers
 Major (Dr.) Albert Okonkwo, Military Administrator of the Mid-Western State of Nigeria in mid-1967 during an attempt to establish the region as the independent Republic of Benin early in the Nigerian Civil War

Monarchs
 Obi Prof Joseph Chike Edozien, the Asagba of Asaba

Politicians

Military

Scientists & inventors

Sports
 Chioma Ajunwa, first female African Olympic gold medallist
 Chioma Igwe
 Ugochukwu Monye

American football players
 Adimchinobi Echemandu, American football running back who is a free agent. He was originally drafted by the Cleveland Browns in the seventh round of the 2004 NFL Draft
 Amobi Okoye
 Buchie Ibeh 
 Chidi Iwuoma
 Chike Okeafor
 Chinedum Ndukwe
 Christian Okoye 
 Chukky Okobi
 Iheanyi Uwaezuoke
 Ike Ndukwe 
 Isaiah Ekejiuba
 Kelechi Osemele
 Kenechi Udeze 
 N. D. Kalu
 Nnamdi Asomugha, American football cornerback for the Oakland Raiders of the National Football League, husband of actress Kerry Washington
 Obed Ariri, American football placekicker in the National Football League
 Osi Umenyiora
 Patrick Chukwurah
 Tony Ugoh 
 Victor Abiamiri, Defensive end for the Philadelphia Eagles of the National Football League

Canadian football players

Athletes

Basketball players

Boxers

Footballers

Rugby
 Martin Offiah

Martial arts

Religion
 Agnes Okoh (1905-1995), Founder of Christ Holy Church International, African Independent Church in Nigeria
 Cyprian Michael Iwene Tansi (1903-1964), beatified by Pope Benedict XVI
 Francis Arinze, Cardinal of the Roman Catholic Church
Peter Ebere Okpaleke, Cardinal of the Roman Catholic Church
 Lazarus Muoka
 Uma Ukpai
 Celestine Arinze Okafor
 T.D. Jakes
Valerian Okeke, Catholic Archbishop of Onitsha Archdiocese and Metropolitan of Onitsha Ecclesiastical Province
 William Drew Robeson I (1844-1918), father of Paul Robeson and the minister of Witherspoon Street Presbyterian Church in Princeton, New Jersey from 1880 to 1901
 William Napoleon Barleycorn (1884-1925), Spanish Guinean Primitive Methodist missionary and author of the first Bube language primer. He was a member of a prominent Fernandino family

References

External links

Igboguide.org – An insight guide to Igboland's Culture and Language
Igbonet- A Network of the Igbo Diaspora
World Igbo Congress Foundation
The Igbo People – Origins and History
Igbo-Ukwu (ca. 9th century) | The Metropolitan Museum of Art
GI Jones Photographic Archive of southeastern Nigeria
Umunna Cultural Association of Indianapolis

Lists of Igbo people
Igbo people